Cor Huijbregts (8 June 1920 – 24 December 2005) was a Dutch footballer. He played in three matches for the Netherlands national football team in 1950.

References

External links
 

1920 births
2005 deaths
Dutch footballers
Netherlands international footballers
Place of birth missing
Association footballers not categorized by position